Eric Trolle (or Erik Arvidsson) (c. 1460–1530) was elected regent of Sweden in 1512, during the era of Kalmar Union. He was Justiciar of Närke and a Lord High Councillor of Sweden from 1487.

Biography
Eric Arvidsson was born around 1460 into an important family of high nobility and was apparently aiming at a clerical career. Eric's parents were lord Arvid Birgersson Trolle (died 1505) and his first wife Kerstin Jonsdotter (Gädda). His father had connected him to the powerful family Thott by marrying Beata Ivarsdotter Tott (died 1487) as his second wife in 1466. His last stepmother was his father's third wife Brita Turesdotter Bielke.

Eric studied at the University of Rostock and University of Cologne, had positions as Canon in Uppsala and Linköping but was never ordained. Eric was elected Regent (riksföreståndare) at the meeting of the High Council of Sweden in 1512 upon the death of regent Svante Nilsson, Lord of Ekesiö, but never actually took office, being superseded by Svante's son, the young Sten Sture the Younger.

He married in 1487 the wealthy Ingeborg Philipsdatter (Thott) (died 1495), his stepmother's first cousin, as his first wife and settled on her manor Ekholmen Castle (Ekholmens slott) in Uppland. His second wife, from about 1512, was Karin Eriksdotter Gyllenstierna, much his junior, who survived until around 1562. She was a great-granddaughter of King Charles VIII of Sweden. Eric Trolle's son Gustav Trolle (1488–1535) became Archbishop of Uppsala and leader of the Church of Sweden.

Wives
 Ingeborg Filipsdotter Tott (married at Fållnäs 30 September 1487, drowned 1495 in Lake Mälaren)
 Karin Eriksdotter Gyllenstierna (married about 1512, died about or before 12 March 1562)

Children

First marriage
 Gustaf Eriksson Trolle, christened 25 September 1488, died July 1535 a prisoner at Gottorp castle, archbishop
 Ermegård Eriksdotter, drowned in lake Mälaren 1495
 Kristina Eriksdotter, drowned in lake Mälaren 1495
 Erik Eriksson, lived 1511

Second marriage
 Beata Eriksdotter Trolle, died 13 April 1591 at Steninge, married 1538 Gabriel Kristiernsson Oxenstierna, who became 1st Baron of Mörby and Steninge (died 1585)
 Ingeborg Eriksdotter Trolle, died 1590, married 13 January 1544 Niels Eriksen Ryning, Lord of Lagnoe and Gimmersta (died 1578)

either first or second marriage:
 Joakim Eriksson Trolle

References

1460s births
1530 deaths
15th-century Swedish people
16th-century Swedish people
16th-century viceregal rulers
Lawspeakers
Rulers of Finland
Regents of Sweden
Swedish nobility
University of Rostock alumni
University of Cologne alumni